Zborovice is a municipality and village in Kroměříž District in the Zlín Region of the Czech Republic. It has about 1,400 inhabitants.

Administrative parts
The village of Medlov is an administrative part of Zborovice.

Geography
It lies in the Litenčice Hills.

History
The first written mention of Zborovice is from 1276, but settlement in the area extends far further into the past. This has been proven by archaeological excavations in a nearby village, 10th century earrings and rings were found.

In the mid-19th century, sugar beet growing spread in the region and a sugar factory was established in Zborovice. In 1881, the railway to Kroměříž was built for the transportation of sugar pulp.

Economy
In the 20th century, the sugar factory was rebuilt and today saw blades are produced there.

Education
In Zborovice is an elementary school and kindergarten.

References

External links

Villages in Kroměříž District